The Angelus is a Christian devotion.

Angelus, The Angelus or Angélus may also refer to:

Arts and entertainment

Film and TV
 The Angelus (film), a 1937 British film starring Richard Cooper
 Angelus (film), a 2000 Polish film by Lech Majewski
 The Angelus (television programme), an Irish televisual institution

Music
 "Angelus" (song), a 2004 song by Hitomi Shimatani
 Angelus, a 1994 album by Milton Nascimento
 "Angelus", a song by Subway to Sally from the 2009 album Kreuzfeuer
 L'Angélus (band), a Cajun fiddle swing band from Louisiana

Other uses in arts and entertainment
 The Angelus (magazine), a monthly publication by the Society of St. Pius X
 Angelus (newspaper), the weekly newspaper of the Roman Catholic Archdiocese of Los Angeles
 The Angelus (painting), by Jean-François Millet
 Angelus, the soulless past nature of the vampire Angel (Buffy the Vampire Slayer), from the television show Buffy the Vampire Slayer and its spin-off series Angel
 The Angelus (comics), female supernatural comics character published by Top Cow Productions
 Angelus, the fictional Western Australian town that is the setting for the Lockie Leonard trilogy of children's novels by Tim Winton and the eponymous TV series

Places
 Angelus, Kansas, an unincorporated community in Sheridan County
 Angelus (Jennings, Louisiana), a historic house
 Angelus Temple, Los Angeles, California
 Angel Sar also known as Angelus, a mountain peak in Pakistan
 Maniniaro / Angelus Peak, a mountain in New Zealand

Species
 Cisthene angelus, a moth of family Erebidae
 Omobranchus angelus, a fish of family Blenniidae
 Pygarctia angelus, a moth of family Erebidae

People
 Angelus of Jerusalem (1185–1220), Catholic saint and martyr
 Andreas Angelus (1561–1598), German clergyman and teacher
 Angelus de Baets (1793–1855), Belgian painter
 Angelus of St. Francis Mason (1599–1678), English Franciscan friar and writer
 Angelus Silesius (1624–1677), German Catholic priest and physician
 Christopher Angelus (fl. 1608–1638), Greek-British writer
 John Angelus of Syrmia ( 1193 – 1259), Byzantine prince
 Oskar Angelus (1892–1979), Estonian politician
 Paulus Angelus (disambiguation), several people
 Pete Angelus, American music manager

Other uses
 Angelus, Catholic prayer
 Angelus, Latin for angel
 Angelus ad virginem, Latin carol on the Annunciation
 Angelus (dynasty), a member of the Byzantine noble and imperial house of the Angeloi
 Angelus Foundation, a London-based charity
 Château Angélus, a Bordeaux wine producer of Saint-Émilion

See also 
 Angelos (disambiguation)